Whiston may refer to:

Places in England
 Whiston, Merseyside
 Whiston, Northamptonshire
 Whiston, South Staffordshire
 Whiston, Staffordshire Moorlands
 Whiston, South Yorkshire

People with the surname
 Daniel Whiston (born 1978), English ice skater
 Donald Whiston (1927–2020), American former ice hockey player
 John Whiston (1893–1956), Associate Professor of Applied Chemistry at the Royal Military College of Science
 Peter Whiston (born 1968), English retired football defender
 William Whiston (1667–1752), English theologian, historian, and mathematician

See also 
 Whitson (disambiguation)
 Wiston (disambiguation)
 Wistow (disambiguation)